Capital Tower is a 52-storey,  skyscraper completed in 2000 in the Shenton Way-Tanjong Pagar financial district of Singapore, located at Robinson Road next to Tanjong Pagar MRT station. It is the fourth tallest skyscraper in the city. Formerly planned as the POSBank's headquarters, ownership of the building was transferred to CapitaLand, and became the company's flagship building and was then named after the company. The building was officially opened on 16 May 2001.

Capital Tower has 52 floors, served by five shuttle double-deck lifts. The lifts can load 3,540 kg and travel at a speed of 10 m/s. The building stands out visually at night as the logo and some parts of the building would change its lights once in every few seconds. 

The top floor of the tower is occupied by the China Club. Only club members have access. The club features a bar, restaurant with private dining rooms and meeting rooms. The club opened on 19 May 2001.

Capital Tower's anchor tenant is GIC Private Limited.

See also
 List of tallest buildings in Singapore
 List of buildings

References

External links

China Club

CapitaLand
Downtown Core (Singapore)
Office buildings completed in 2000
Skyscraper office buildings in Singapore
20th-century architecture in Singapore